The Northwest One Library is part of the District of Columbia Public Library (DCPL) System. It was originally opened to the public in December 2009.

History 
The library was built as part of a collaborative project with the DC Public Schools (Walker-Jones Educational Center), Department of Parks and Recreation and the Office of the Deputy Mayor for Planning and Economic Development. The Northwest One development project produced a state‐of‐the‐art facility including a Preschool‐8th grade school, a public library and a technology center.

The neighborhood had previously been served by a kiosk library until it was closed in 2008. The kiosk, a plexiglass and metal booth approximately 1,400 square feet in size, was built in the late 1970s. It was intended to last only seven years.

See also
 Sursum Corda, Washington, D.C.

References

Library buildings completed in 2010
Public libraries in Washington, D.C.